Mangrove crabs are crabs that live among mangroves, and may belong to many different species and even families. They have been shown to be ecologically significant in many ways. They keep much of the energy within the forest by burying and consuming leaf litter. Along with burrowing in the ground, at high tide and in the face of predators these crustaceans can climb trees to protect themselves. The hermit crab and the mangrove crab are the only crustaceans that can climb trees as a defense mechanism. Furthermore, their feces may form the basis of a coprophagous food chain contributing to mangrove secondary production.

Mangrove crab larvae are the major source of food for juvenile fish inhabiting the adjacent waterways, indicating that crabs also help nearshore fisheries. The adult crabs are food for threatened species such as the crab plover.

Their burrows alter the topography and sediment grain size of the mangrove, and help aerate the sediment. Removing crabs from an area causes significant increases in sulfides and ammonium concentrations, which in turn affects the productivity and reproductive output of the vegetation, supporting the hypothesis that mangrove crabs are a keystone species.

Species of mangrove crabs 
 Aratus pisonii, Americas
 Haberma, genus of small mangrove crabs, Indo-Pacific, including:
 Haberma tingkok, Hong Kong
 Metopograpsus messor, Indo-Pacific
 Metopograpsus thukuhar, Indo-Pacific
 Neosarmatium meinerti, Indo-Pacific
 Neosarmatium smithi, Indo-Pacific
 Parasesarma leptosoma, western Indian Ocean
 Perisesarma, genus with 23 species, primarily Indo-Pacific, with two West African species, including:
 Perisesarma bidens, Indo-Pacific
 Perisesarma guttatum, western Indian Ocean
 Scylla serrata, Indo-Pacific
 Scylla tranquebarica, Indo-Pacific
 Sesarma, genus with close to 20 species, many of which live in mangroves, Americas, Indo-Pacific
 Ucides cordatus, western Atlantic Ocean

See also 
Fiddler crab
Grapsidae
Mangrove ecoregions

References

External links
 East African mangrove crabs
Spotted Mangrove Crab (Caribbean and Florida)
 Mangrove Crab Aquaculture
 Mangrove crabs at Sungei Buloh Nature Park
 Mangrove crab Ucides cordatus (Brazil)
 Complete larval and early juvenile development of the mangrove crab Perisesarma fasciatum (Singapore)
 Laboratory cultured zoeae and megalopa of the mangrove crab Metaplax distincta
 Regulation of pulmonary blood flow and of blood pressure in a mangrove crab (Goniopsis cruentata)
 Haberma nanum, a new genus and new species of mangrove crab from Singapore

Crabs
Mangrove fauna
Arthropod common names

ja:ノコギリガザミ